The Port of Melilla is a cargo, fishing, and passenger port and marina located in Melilla, a Spanish autonomous city off the coast of North Africa.

History 

A port existed in Phoenician and Punic Russadir that continued its activity under Roman rule after the fall of Carthage. During the Middle Ages the port presumably played a part in the interchange of gold, ivory, slaves and cereals imported by the Caliphate of Córdoba in exchange for perfume, leather, silk and fabric.

Description 

It is managed by the port authority of the same name. It competes against the neighbouring port of Beni Ansar (Nador). By 2008 the port moved around  tonnes of cargo and  passengers.

The port has a ferry connection to Málaga, Motril and Almería.

References 
Citations

Bibliography
 
 
 
 
 
 

Melilla
Transport in Melilla
Ports and harbours in Africa
Buildings and structures in Melilla